Dipropyl peroxydicarbonate (trade name Luperox 221) is an organic peroxide with a variety of industrial uses, particularly as an initiator of polymerization.

Dipropyl peroxydicarbonate decomposes explosively at  due to a self-accelerating exothermic decomposition.

References

Organic peroxides